The Ukraine International, Kharkiv International or Kharkov International is an open international badminton tournament in Ukraine. This tournament is one of the youngest international championships in Badminton Europe

Previous Winners

Performances by nation 
Updated after the 2021 edition.

References 

Badminton tournaments in Ukraine
Sports competitions in Ukraine
Sport in Kharkiv